Borth may refer to:

Places
 Borth, coastal village in the county of Ceredigion, Mid Wales
Borth bog, or Cors Fochno
Borth railway station
 Borth, Wisconsin, unincorporated community in Waushara County, Wisconsin, United States
 Borth (Rheinberg), subdivision of Rheinberg, North Rhine-Westphalia, Germany

People named Borth
 Frank Borth (1918–2009), American comic book artist
 Michelle Borth (born 1978), American actress
 Damian Borth (born 1981), German Computer Scientist